United States gubernatorial elections were held in three states in October and November 1999. Kentucky and Mississippi held their general elections on November 4. Louisiana held the first round of its jungle primary on October 23 and did not need to hold a runoff.

The Democratic Party had a net gain of one seat, picking up an open seat in Mississippi.

Summary

Closest races 
States where the margin of victory was under 5%:
 Mississippi, 1.1%

See also 
 1999 United States elections
 1999 United States House of Representatives elections